Marcus Laurence "Marc" Robinson (born 22 September 1953) is a former Australian politician. He was a Labor member of the Australian Capital Territory House of Assembly for Fraser from 1979 to 1982. In 1984 he was expected to win preselection to stand for the federal seat of Fraser, but was unexpectedly defeated by John Langmore.

References

1953 births
Living people
Members of the Australian Capital Territory House of Assembly
Place of birth missing (living people)
Australian Labor Party members of the Australian Capital Territory House of Assembly